The 2020 Maui Invitational Tournament is an early-season college basketball tournament played for the 37th time.  The tournament began in 1984, and is part of the 2020–21 NCAA Division I men's basketball season. The championship round of the tournament was played at the Harrah's Cherokee Center in Asheville, North Carolina from November 30–December 2, 2020. Due to COVID-19 concerns, the championship round of the tournament had been moved from its normal location of Lahaina Civic Center in Maui, Hawaii.

Bracket

References

Maui Invitational Tournament
Maui Invitational
Maui Invitational
Maui Invitational
Maui Invitational